Raúl Leonel Paredes Vega (born 9 November 1962) is a Mexican lawyer and politician affiliated with the National Action Party. As of 2014 he served as Deputy of the LIX Legislature of the Mexican Congress representing the State of Mexico.

References

1962 births
Living people
Politicians from the State of Mexico
20th-century Mexican lawyers
National Action Party (Mexico) politicians
Universidad del Valle de México alumni
21st-century Mexican politicians
Deputies of the LIX Legislature of Mexico
Members of the Chamber of Deputies (Mexico) for the State of Mexico